Dragutin "Drago" Štritof (1 August 1923 – 2 November 2014) was a Croatian middle-distance runner who competed for Yugoslavia. He competed in the men's 3000 metres steeplechase at the 1952 Summer Olympics.

References

1923 births
2014 deaths
Athletes (track and field) at the 1952 Summer Olympics
Croatian male middle-distance runners
Yugoslav male middle-distance runners
Yugoslav male steeplechase runners
Olympic athletes of Yugoslavia
Place of birth missing